Beryozovo is a rural locality (a selo) and the administrative center of Beryozovskoye Rural Settlement, Ramonsky District, Voronezh Oblast, Russia. The population was 1,542 as of 2010. There are 25 streets.

Geography 
Beryozovo is located 4 km north of Ramon (the district's administrative centre) by road. Ramon is the nearest rural locality.

References 

Rural localities in Ramonsky District